Archips is a genus of tortrix moths the tribe Archipini. Species include the oak leaf roller (A. semiferanus), which eats the leaves of oak trees.

Species

Archips abiephage (Yasuda, 1975)
Archips alberta (McDunnough, 1923)
Archips alcmaeonis (Meyrick, 1928)
Archips alleni Tuck, 1990
Archips arcanus Razowski, 1977
Archips argyrospila (Walker, 1863) – fruit-tree leafroller moth
Archips asiaticus Walsingham, 1900
Archips atrolucens (Diakonoff, 1941)
Archips audax Razowski, 1977
Archips bachmanus Razowski, 2009
Archips baolokia Razowski, 2009
Archips barlowi Tuck, 1990
Archips betulana (Hubner, [1787])
Archips biforatus (Meyrick, 1930)
Archips binigratus (Meyrick, 1928)
Archips breviplicanus Walsingham, 1900
Archips brunneatus Razowski, 2009
Archips bulbosus Razowski, 2009
Archips cantinus Razowski, 2006
Archips capsigeranus (Kennel, 1901)
Archips carteri Rose & Pooni, 2004
Archips cerasivoranus (Fitch, 1856) – ugly-nest caterpillar
Archips ceylonicus Razowski, 1977
Archips citimus Razowski, 1977
Archips compitalis Razowski, 1977
Archips crassifolianus Liu, 1990
Archips crataeganus (Hubner, [1796-1799]) – brown oak tortrix

Archips davisi Kawabe, 1989
Archips dichotoma Falkovitsh, 1965
Archips dierli Diakonoff, 1976
Archips dispilanus (Walker, 1864)
Archips dissitanus (Grote, 1879)
Archips eleagnanus (McDunnough, 1923)
Archips elongatus Liu, 1987
Archips emitescens (Meyrick, in de Joannis, 1930)
Archips enodis Razowski, 1977
Archips eupatris (Meyrick, 1908)
Archips euryplinthus (Meyrick, 1923)
Archips eximius Razowski, 1984
Archips expansus (Diakonoff, 1941)
Archips fervidanus (Clemens, 1860) – oak webworm
Archips formosanus (Kawabe, 1968)
Archips fraternus Tuck, 1990
Archips fumosus Kodama, 1960
Archips fuscocupreanus (Walsingham, 1900)
Archips georgianus (Walker, 1863)
Archips goyeranus Kruse, 2000 – baldcypress leafroller

Archips griseus (Robinson, 1869) – black shield leafroller, gray archips moth
Archips gyraleus Diakonoff, 1982
Archips inanis Razowski, 1977
Archips infumatanus (Zeller, 1875)
Archips ingentanus (Christoph, 1881)
Archips inopinatanus (Kennel, 1901)
Archips insulanus (Kawabe, 1965)
Archips issikii Kodama, 1960
Archips kangraensis Rose & Pooni, 2004
Archips kellerianus Liu, 1987
Archips limatus Razowski, 1977
Archips machlopis (Meyrick, 1912)
Archips magnificus Tuck, 1990
Archips magnolianus (Fernald, 1892)
Archips menotoma (Meyrick, 1937)
Archips meridionalis Yasuda & Kawabe, 1980
Archips mertias Rose & Pooni, 2004
Archips micaceanus (Walker, 1863)
Archips mimicus Walsingham, in Swinhoe, 1900
Archips mortuanus (Kearfott, 1907)
Archips myricanus (McDunnough, 1923)
Archips myrrhophanes (Meyrick, in Caradja, 1931)
Archips naltaricus Razowski, 2006
Archips negundanus (Dyar, 1902) – larger boxelder leafroller
Archips nigricaudanus (Walsingham, 1900)
Archips nigriplaganus Franclemont, 1986
Archips okuiho Razowski, 2009
Archips opiparus Liu, 1987
Archips oporana (Linnaeus, 1758)
Archips pachyvalvus Liu, 1987
Archips packardianus (Fernald, 1886)
Archips paredraeus (Meyrick, 1931)

Archips pensilis (Meyrick, 1920)
Archips peratratus Yasuda, 1961
Archips philippa (Meyrick, 1918)
Archips podana (Scopoli, 1763) – large fruit tree tortrix
Archips pseudotermias Rose & Pooni, 2004
Archips pulchra (Butler, 1879)
Archips punctiseriatus (Strand, 1920)
Archips purpuranus (Clemens, 1865)
Archips rileyanus (Grote, 1868)
Archips rosana (Linnaeus, 1758) – rose tortrix
Archips rudy Razowski, 1977
Archips seditiosus (Meyrick, 1921)
Archips semiferanus (Walker, 1863) – oak leafroller
Archips semistructus (Meyrick, 1937)
Archips shibatai Kawabe, 1985
Archips silvicolanus Razowski, 2009
Archips socotranus Walsingham, 1900
Archips solidus (Meyrick, 1908)

Archips spinatus Liu, 1987
Archips stellatus Jinbo, 2006
Archips strianus Fernald, 1905
Archips strigopterus Liu, 1987
Archips strojny Razowski, 1977
Archips subgyraleus Razowski, 2009
Archips subrufanus (Snellen, 1883)
Archips subsidiarius (Meyrick, 1924)
Archips symmetrus (Meyrick, 1918)
Archips taichunganus Razowski, 2000
Archips taiwanensis Kawabe, 1985
Archips termias (Meyrick, 1918) – apple leafroller
Archips tharsaleopus (Meyrick, in Caradja & Meyrick, 1935)
Archips tsuganus (Powell, 1962)
Archips unimaculatus Shiraki, 1913
Archips vagrans Tuck, 1990
Archips viola Falkovitsh, 1965
Archips vivesi Razowski, 2009
Archips wallacei Tuck, 1990
Archips xylosteanus (Linnaeus, 1758) – variegated golden tortrix, brown oak tortrix

Selected former species
Archips occidentalis (Walsingham, 1891)

Synonyms
 Archiceps Weiss & Dickerson, 1921
 Archippus H.A. Freeman, 1958
 Archyps Liu, 1987
 Cacoecia Hübner, [1825] 1816
 Cacoesia Llewellyn-Jones, 1939
 Parachips Kuznetzov, 1970 [subgenus of Archips]

References

 , 2005: World catalogue of insects volume 5 Tortricidae.
 , 1822, Syst.-alphab. Verz. 58.
 , 1958: A Note on Microlepidoptera from South China (Lepidoptera: Tortricidae & Oecophoridae). Beiträge zur Entomologie 8 (1-2): 118–122.
 , 1987: A study of Chinese Archips Hübner,1822 (Lepidoptera:Tortricidae). Sinozoologia 5: 125–146. Full article: .
 , 2009, Tortricidae from Vietnam in the collection of the Berlin Museum.5. Archipini and Sparganothini (Lepidoptera: Tortricidae), Shilap revista de Lepidopterologia 37 (145): 41–60.
 , 2009, Tortricidae from Vietnam in the collection of the Berlin Museum. 7.Some additional data (Lepidoptera: Tortricidae), Polish Journal of Entomology 78 (1): 15–32. Full article: .
 , 1990: A taxonomic revision of the Malaysian and Indonesian species of Archips Hübner (Lepidoptera: Tortricidae). Insect Systematics & Evolution 21 (2): 179–196. Abstract: .

External links
 Tortricidae.com

 
Archipini
Tortricidae genera
Taxa named by Jacob Hübner